"Främling" ("Stranger"), written by Lasse Holm and Monica Forsberg and arranged by , was the song performed by the 16-year-old Swedish singer Carola Häggkvist which won the  Melodifestivalen 1983. At the Eurovision Song Contest 1983 in Munich, in the former West Germany, the song finished third. It was performed fourth on the night, after the 's song "I'm Never Giving Up" by Sweet Dreams, and before 's entry "Per Lucia" by Riccardo Fogli. "Främling" became a huge hit in Scandinavia, charting in Finland, Norway and Sweden, peaking at number six, one and five.

Trivia
Kikki Danielsson was first asked to sing "Främling", but instead she chose "Varför är kärleken röd?", which finished second in the Swedish Melodifestivalen that year.
"Främling" was also written with text versions in German, Dutch and English as, respectively, "Fremder", "Je ogen hebben geen geheimen" and "Love Isn't Love".

Cover versions
 The Swedish heavy metal group Black Ingvars covered "Främling" on their 1998 album Schlager Metal.
 Finnish singer Meiju Suvas covered the song in Finnish, as "Muukalainen" (also translating as "stranger").
 The Norwegian free-jazz band Farmers Market has covered "Främling" on several concerts, and on their 2008 album Surfin' USSR. Farmers Market often use unusual time signatures, and their version of Främling switch between 11/16, 15/16, 7/16 and 13/16. The live version usually also has four bars of 2/4.

Charts

References

1983 songs
Carola Häggkvist songs
Eurovision songs of 1983
Melodifestivalen songs of 1983
Eurovision songs of Sweden
Songs written by Lasse Holm
Songs written by Monica Forsberg
Music based on art
Mariann Grammofon singles
Number-one singles in Norway
1983 singles
Schlager songs